Sandra James (née Henderson c. 1960) is a former Canadian gymnast best known for co-lighting the Olympic Flame with Stéphane Préfontaine at the 1976 Summer Olympics in Montreal. She appeared on the front page of Sports Illustrated.

Sandra Henderson tried out for the Olympic gymnastics team at the age of 16 to compete in the 1976 summer games but did not make it due to injuries. She retired from gymnastics in 1977 but continued competing at the university level when she was a student at the University of Toronto.

1980 Olympics
At the beginning of the 1980 Summer Olympics Sandra Henderson, along with Stéphane, were given the task of delivering the Olympic flag from Montreal mayor Jean Drapeau to Lord Killanin in Moscow. Historically the Olympic flag was passed from host city mayor to the next host city mayor but Canada was one of 64 countries that boycotted the games that year.

References 

Living people
Olympic cauldron lighters
1960 births